is a Tongan-born, Japanese rugby union player who plays as a Flanker. He currently plays for Kobelco Steelers in Japan's domestic Top League. He received Japanese Citizenship in 2020.

International

After 2 Top League seasons for Kobelco Steelers, Lui Naeata received his first call-up to his adopted country, Japan head coach Jamie Joseph has named Lui Naeata in a 52-man training squad ahead of British and Irish Lions test.

References

External Links
itsrugby.co.uk Profile

1994 births
Living people
Japanese rugby union players
Tongan rugby union players
Rugby union flankers
Kobelco Kobe Steelers players
Tongan expatriates in Japan
NTT DoCoMo Red Hurricanes Osaka players
Toyota Industries Shuttles Aichi players